Southern United F.C. may refer to:

Southern United F.C. (England), football club in England
Southern United F.C. (Solomon Islands), football club in the Solomon Islands
Southern United FC, football club in New Zealand